Eustromula keiferi is a species of beetle in the family Cerambycidae. It was described by Earle Gorton Linsley in 1934.

References

Elaphidiini
Beetles described in 1934